William G. Draper (June 28, 1920 – November 26, 1964) was a career military officer and Air Force Aide to President Dwight D. Eisenhower.

He was born in Cuyahoga Falls, Ohio and graduated from Central High School  in Washington, D.C. in 1939.  He obtained his CAA private and commercial licenses in 1940, and in 1941 received his instructor's rating at the Wilmington, Delaware airport. In November 1942 he joined the United States Army Air Forces and was commissioned a 2nd Lieutenant.  He was assigned to Air Transport Command North Atlantic Wing  ferrying B-17 Flying Fortress bombers to England and North Africa.  He later was assigned to the Air Transport command India-China Division  “Fireball Line,” which flew supplies and equipment in the China-Burma-India Theater from Miami to Assam, India.

From 1950 to 1952 he was the personal pilot for General Dwight D. Eisenhower, Supreme Commander of the Allied Powers, and later served as President Eisenhower's personal pilot and Air Force Aide.  Colonel Draper was the pilot of Eisenhower's Presidential plane "Columbine," the predecessor of what we now call "Air Force One."

On November 26, 1964, he committed suicide by hanging himself, reportedly depressed after a heart attack ended his service as a pilot, which he had been continuously since he was 19. He was interred at Arlington National Cemetery, Virginia.

Draper appeared on an episode of What's My Line.

References

External links
 Papers and Records of Col. William G. Draper, Dwight D. Eisenhower Presidential Library
 
  New York Times obituary of William G. Draper

United States Air Force officers
People from Cuyahoga Falls, Ohio
1920 births
1964 deaths
United States Army Air Forces personnel of World War II
Suicides by hanging in Maryland
American military personnel who committed suicide